Grandidierina petiti is a species of skink endemic to Madagascar.

References

Reptiles of Madagascar
Reptiles described in 1924
Grandidierina
Taxa named by Fernand Angel